Østerberg is a Norwegian surname. Notable people with the name include:

 Dag Østerberg (1938-2017), Norwegian sociologist, philosopher and musicologist
 Erling Østerberg (1901–1981), Norwegian police officer

See also
 Osterberg, German municipality
 Österberg, surname

Norwegian-language surnames